Glutinoglossum americanum is a species of earth tongue fungus that was described as new to science in 2015. It is found in the United States, where it grows on the ground, often among moss, in mixed deciduous forests.

References

External links

Geoglossaceae
Fungi of the United States
Fungi described in 2015
Fungi without expected TNC conservation status